Ibid. is an abbreviation for the Latin word ibīdem, meaning "in the same place", commonly used in an endnote, footnote, bibliography citation, or scholarly reference to refer to the source cited in the preceding note or list item. This is similar to Idem, literally meaning "the same", abbreviated id., which is commonly used in legal citation.

Ibid. may also be used in the Chicago (name-date) system for in-text references where there has been a close previous citation from the same source material. The previous reference should be immediately visible, e.g. within the same paragraph or page. 

Some academic publishers now prefer that "ibid." not be italicised, as it is a commonly found term. Usage differs from style or citation guides as to whether ibid should be suffixed with a full stop. For example, Oxford Standard for Citation of Legal Authorities omits full stops and does not capitalise, while the Economist Style guide uses a lower case starting letter with ending full stop.

Example
[1] E. Vijh, Latin for Dummies (New York: Academic, 1997), 23.
[2] Ibid.
[3] Ibid., 29.
[4] A. Alhazred, The Necronomicon (Petrus de Dacia, 1994).
[5] Ibid. 1, 34.
Reference 2 is the same as reference 1: E. Vijh, Latin for Dummies on page 23, whereas reference 3 refers to the same work but at a different location, namely page 29. Intervening entries require a reference to the original citation in the form Ibid. <citation #>, as in reference 5.

Cultural references

 Ibid. is used in the 1960s play Who's Afraid of Virginia Woolf? by Edward Albee. Albee uses an unabbreviated ibid (i.e. ibīdem) in his stage directions to tell an actor to use the same tone as the previous line.
 In the Discworld novels Pyramids and Small Gods by Terry Pratchett, an Ephebian philosopher is called Ibid, mentioned in the latter as the author of Discourses.
 In the 1997 movie Good Will Hunting, the main character, Will Hunting, when arguing for himself in court against the dismissive rebuttals of the prosecuting attorney, cites obscure case law, then follows up by stating "Ibid, your Honor."

See also
 
 Ditto mark
 Em dash
 Loc. cit.
 Op. cit.
 Supra (grammar)
 List of Latin abbreviations

References

External links

 Ibid. on Dictionary.com
 Introduction to bibliographies and citation styles

Bibliography
Latin words and phrases
Abbreviations